The 2004 All-Big Ten Conference football team consists of American football players chosen as All-Big Ten Conference players for the 2004 Big Ten Conference football season.  The conference recognizes two official All-Big Ten selectors: (1) the Big Ten conference coaches selected separate offensive and defensive units and named first- and second-team players (the "Coaches" team); and (2) a panel of sports writers and broadcasters covering the Big Ten also selected offensive and defensive units and named first- and second-team players (the "Media" team).

Offensive selections

Quarterbacks
 Drew Tate, Iowa (Coaches-1; Media-2)
 Kyle Orton, Purdue (Coaches-2; Media-1)

Running backs
 Mike Hart, Michigan (Coaches-1; Media-1)
 Laurence Maroney, Minnesota (Coaches-1; Media-1) 
 Noah Herron, Northwestern (Coaches-2; Media-2)
 Anthony Davis, Wisconsin (Coaches-2; Media-2)

Receivers
 Braylon Edwards, Michigan (Coaches-1; Media-1)
 Taylor Stubblefield, Purdue (Coaches-1; Media-1)
 Jason Avant, Michigan (Coaches-2)
 Santonio Holmes, Ohio State (Coaches-2)
 Courtney Roby, Indiana (Media-2)
 Clinton Solomon, Iowa (Media-2)

Centers
 Greg Eslinger, Minnesota (Coaches-1 [tie]; Media-1)
 David Baas, Michigan (Coaches-1 [tie]; Media-2)

Guards
 Dan Buenning, Wisconsin (Coaches-1; Media-1)
 Matt Lentz, Michigan (Coaches-1; Media-2)
 Mark Setterstrom, Minnesota (Coaches-2; Media-1)
 Jonathan Clinkscale, Wisconsin (Coaches-2)
 William Whitticker, Michigan State (Media-2)

Tackles
 Rian Melander, Minnesota (Coaches-1; Media-1)
 Adam Stenavich, Michigan (Coaches-1; Media-2)
 Sean Poole, Michigan State (Coaches-2; Media-1)
 Zach Strief, Northwestern (Coaches-2; Media-2)
 Jake Long, Michigan (Coaches-2)

Tight ends
 Tim Massaquoi, Michigan (Coaches-1; Media-1)
 Jason Randall, Michigan State (Coaches-2)
 Charles Davis, Purdue (Media-2)

Defensive selections

Defensive linemen
 Matt Roth, Iowa (Coaches-1; Media-1)
 Anttaj Hawthorne, Wisconsin (Coaches-1; Media-1)
 Erasmus James, Wisconsin (Coaches-1; Media-1)
 Gabe Watson, Michigan (Coaches-1; Media-2)
 Jonathan Babineaux, Iowa (Coaches-2; Media-1)
 Luis Castillo, Northwestern (Coaches-2; Media-2)
 Tamba Hali, Penn State (Coaches-2; Media-2)
 Simon Fraser, Ohio State (Coaches-2)
 Darrell Reid, Minnesota (Media-2)

Linebackers
 Chad Greenway, Iowa (Coaches-1; Media-1)
 A. J. Hawk, Ohio State (Coaches-1; Media-1)
 Abdul Hodge, Iowa (Coaches-1; Media-2)
 Tim McGarigle, Northwestern (Coaches-2; Media-1)
 Paul Posluszny, Penn State (Coaches-2; Media-2)
 LaMarr Woodley, Michigan (Coaches-2)
 Kyle Killion, Indiana (Media-2)

Defensive backs
 Marlin Jackson, Michigan (Coaches-1; Media-1)
 Ernest Shazor, Michigan (Coaches-1; Media-1)
 Jim Leonhard, Wisconsin (Coaches-1; Media-1)
 Scott Starks, Wisconsin (Coaches-1; Media-2)
 Ukee Dozier, Minnesota (Media-1)
 Kelvin Hayden, Illinois (Coaches-2; Media-2)
 Alan Zemaitis, Penn State (Coaches-2; Media-2)
 Nate Salley, Ohio State (Coaches-2)
 Bernard Pollard, Purdue (Coaches-2)
 Herana-Daze Jones, Indiana (Media-2)

Special teams

Kickers
 Mike Nugent, Ohio State (Coaches-1; Media-1)
 Dave Rayner, Michigan State (Coaches-2; Media-2)

Punters
 Steve Weatherford, Illinois (Coaches-1; Media-2)
Brandon Fields, Michigan State (Coaches-2; Media-1)

Key
Bold = selected as a first-team player by both the coaches and media panel

Coaches = selected by Big Ten Conference coaches

Media = selected by a media panel

HM = Honorable mention

See also
 2004 College Football All-America Team

References

All-Big Ten Conference
All-Big Ten Conference football teams